Bridgeport is a city in Wise County, Texas, United States. The population was 5,923 in 2020. In 2009, Bridgeport was named by the Texas Legislature as the Stagecoach Capital of Texas.

History
Bridgeport's history began in February 1860 when William H. Hunt was granted a charter from the West Fork Bridge Company to build a bridge across the West Fork of the Trinity River. The bridge was located approximately one mile southwest of the present townsite. A Texas State Historical Marker alongside Farm To Market Road 920 denotes the spot of the original bridge today .

The wooden bridge was used for a portion of the Butterfield Overland Mail stage route used for only a few months between August 1860 and March 1861. After the American Civil War began, the mail route was no longer used and the original wooden bridge was abandoned, deteriorated and collapsed into the river.

In 1873 a new iron bridge was built and a post office established, thus formally creating the city of Bridgeport, TX. Its future was assured in 1882 when Charles Cates discovered a vein of bituminous coal while drilling for water. The Wise County Coal Company was formed and was a leading producer of coal for the state until competition from natural gas and petroleum closed the coal mines in 1929.

In 1893 the Rock Island Railroad established a line east of the town, so the town moved approximately one mile east to its present site. In 1913 the town was incorporated. Gas and Oil production became a local industry prior to 1917. The 1920s census showed a town of 1,872. During the 1920s, limestone quarries that produced aggregate for road construction and a brick factory were established. In 1931, a dam was constructed approximately three miles west of town on the West Fork of the Trinity River, creating Lake Bridgeport. The lake was a local center for recreation and remains so today.

During the latter half of the 20th century, Bridgeport's oil, gas, and limestone industries continued to flourish and the town became the second largest town in Wise County. These industries continue to be the local economic leaders.

Geography

Bridgeport is located at  (33.209319, –97.772440).

Demographics

As of the 2020 United States census, there were 5,923 people, 1,777 households, and 1,322 families residing in the city.

Education
Bridgeport is served by the Bridgeport Independent School District.

Transportation
Bridgeport is served by the Bridgeport Municipal Airport.

Highways

Recreation
Lake Bridgeport is located west of the city and offers recreational boating and watersports, as well as freshwater fishing.

The City operates Northwest OHV Park on the north of the city limits.  This is a 300-acre park for motorcycles, ATVs, UTVs, and Jeeps to roam over trails through varied terrain.

Banking
For almost 100 years, Bridgeport was served by the First National Bank of Bridgeport. The bank was purchased in the late 1900s by primary investors Billie C. Green, W.W. "Wilson" Ray, and M.L. Manoushagian. It, however, was sold in December 2005 to First Financial Bank (Texas) (stock symbol FFIN) based in Abilene and became part of a six branch bank consisting of institutions in Bridgeport, Boyd, Decatur, Keller, and Trophy Club.

The Community Bank opened the doors for business in June 2007. It is the only locally owned and independently operated bank in Bridgeport, Texas.  Every year, the bank donates thousands of dollars and numerous hours of community service to the school district and local charities.
The Community Bank is guided by officers Theresa East, Jamie Cook and Joe Murphy.

Notable people
 Kyle Clifton, formerly of the NFL New York Jets, graduated from Bridgeport High School in 1980 after having been born in Olney, Texas. Although he played linebacker at Texas Christian University and then the Jets, Clifton played quarterback for the Bridgeport Bulls his junior and senior years, leading the Bulls to a 9–1 record in the former. He was a third round draft pick of the Jets and played with the team his 13-year career, from 1984 to 1996.
 Colin Jones (American football), NFL safety for the Carolina Panthers

Climate
The climate in this area is characterized by hot, humid summers and generally mild to cool winters.  According to the Köppen climate classification system, Bridgeport has a humid subtropical climate, Cfa on climate maps.

References

Further reading
 David Minor, "BRIDGEPORT, TX," Handbook of Texas Online (https://tshaonline.org/handbook/online/articles/hgb11), accessed May 28, 2011. Published by the Texas State Historical Association.

External links
 City of Bridgeport Official Website
 Wise County on the Web
 

Cities in Texas
Cities in Wise County, Texas
Dallas–Fort Worth metroplex
Butterfield Overland Mail in Texas
Stagecoach stops in the United States